is a former Japanese football player and manager.

Playing career
Nakamura was born in Shimabara on July 30, 1958. After graduating from Osaka University of Commerce, he played for Mazda (later Sanfrecce Hiroshima) from 1981 to 1991.

Coaching career
After retirement, Nakamura started coaching career at Mazda from 1991. He mainly managed youth team until August 2002. In August 2002, he moved to Avispa Fukuoka and became a manager. In 2003, he became a general manager and he left the club in 2007.

Managerial statistics

References

External links

1958 births
Living people
Osaka University of Commerce alumni
Association football people from Nagasaki Prefecture
Japanese footballers
Japan Soccer League players
Sanfrecce Hiroshima players
Japanese football managers
J2 League managers
Avispa Fukuoka managers
Association football defenders